Syrian Argentines are Argentine citizens of Syrian descent or Syrian-born people who reside in Argentina. Argentina has the second highest number of Syrians in South America after Brazil. Syrian immigration to Argentina has been and is currently, one of the most important Arab migration flows into Argentina. Immigration waves peaked in the 20th century, although in recent years due to the constant wars in the Middle East, immigration from Syria has been increasing over time. Like other Arab Argentines, they are universally known as "turcos" ("Turks"), like in the rest of Latin American countries.

In October 2014, because of the war raging in Syria and increased violence and persecution of civilians, the Argentine government has announced that it will begin to receive Syrian refugees in their country, being the second South American nation to do this after Uruguay.

History 

Most Syrians emigrating to Argentina established themselves in the northwest of the country, as did the Lebanese people. The Syrians, like the Lebanese, were mostly hawkers and did not practice agriculture. Thus, they did not settle in agricultural colonies but stayed in the cities in greater numbers than other immigrants. Sarmiento and Alberdi's plan to populate regions emptied of indigenous peoples did not materialize, as most of the newcomers chose cities. In the period from 1975 to 1977, their numbers decreased again. The first destination of these groups of Syrian and Lebanese was the province of Buenos Aires and from there many migrated further into the country, attracted by landscapes that resembled much of their native land. Many of these people settled in Salta, Jujuy, La Rioja, San Juan, Mendoza, Santiago del Estero, Misiones, Chaco and Patagonia. In these provinces, they were devoted primarily to agricultural work.

Notable people 
 Carlos Menem, politician and former President of Argentina. 
 Juliana Awada, businesswoman and First Lady of Argentina, married to president Mauricio Macri.
 Carlos Fayt, member of the Supreme Court of Justice of Argentina.
 Juan José Saer, writer.
 Eduardo Falú, folk music guitarist and composer.
 Luis Juez, politician who served as Mayor of the City of Córdoba and later elected to the Senate.
 Alan Faena, hotelier and real estate developer.
 Leonardo Favio, singer, actor, film director and screenwriter.
 Jorge Sahade, astronomer and former president of the International Astronomical Union.
 Jorge Antonio, businessman and close adviser of Juan Domingo Perón.
 Lorenzo Miguel, labor leader.
 Jalil Elías, professional footballer.

See also 

 Immigration to Argentina
 Arab Argentines
 Asian Argentines
 Syrians in Uruguay

References 

Arab Argentine
 
Ethnic groups in Argentina
Syrian diaspora in South America